Inglewood High School is a four-year public high school in Inglewood, California.

History
The school opened its doors in 1905. 
On October 29, 2021, Inglewood High School beat Morningside High School 106-0. The win caused outrage for which the principal later apologized for "poor sportsmanship".

Notable faculty
Gladys Waddingham, author, taught Spanish for 45 years at the high school
Daniel Anthony Farris (also known as D Smoke), rap artist, Spanish and music-theory teacher

Notable alumni
 Glenn M. Anderson, 37th Lieutenant Governor of California, Congressman 
 Sonny Bono, singer, songwriter, actor and politician 
 Robert Finch, 38th Lieutenant Governor of California
 Donald Merrifield, Jesuit priest and president of Loyola University of Los Angeles
 Edla Muir, architect
 Mack 10, American rapper
 Ms. Toi, American rapper

Basketball
 DeAngelo Collins, professional basketball player
 Jason Crowe, professional basketball player
 Ade Dagunduro, professional basketball player
 Lauren Ervin, professional basketball player 
 Noel Felix professional basketball player
 Jason Hart, NBA basketball player 
 Jay Humphries, professional basketball player
 Ralph Jackson, NBA basketball player 
 Travele Jones, professional basketball player
 Vince Kelley, NBL Australia basketball player
 Harold Miner, USC and NBA basketball player 
 Paul Pierce, NBA basketball player, 10-time All-Star 
 Reggie Theus, professional basketball player and college head coach
 Doug Thomas, professional basketball player

Baseball
 Coco Crisp, Major League Baseball player 
 Dottie Wiltse Collins, AAGPBL player and 'Strikeout Queen'
 Gail Henley, professional baseball player
 Horacio Ramirez former coach in the  Mexican League and former Major League Baseball player

Football
 Shaquelle Evans, NFL football player
 Lawrence Jackson, NFL football player 
 Gary Kerkorian, NFL football player 
 Verl Lillywhite, professional football player
 Patrick Onwuasor, NFL player
 Jarvis Redwine, professional football player
 Jim Sears, AFL and NFL football player 
 Jim Sutherland, college football head coach, class of 1933
 Zaven Yaralian, football coach
 Benson Mayowa, NFL football player for Seattle Seahawks

References

External links

Schools in Inglewood, California
1905 establishments in California
Educational institutions established in 1905
Public high schools in California